The 2022 Dead On Tools 200 was the seventh stock car race of the 2022 NASCAR Camping World Truck Series and the third iteration of the event. The race was held on Friday, May 6, 2022, in Darlington, South Carolina at Darlington Raceway, a  permanent egg-shaped racetrack. The race was increased from 147 to 149 laps, due to a NASCAR overtime finish. At race's end, John Hunter Nemechek of Kyle Busch Motorsports would win, after holding off Carson Hocevar in the final restart. He would also lead the most laps. This was Nemechek's 12th career truck series win, and his first of the season. To fill out the podium, Grant Enfinger of GMS Racing would finish 3rd, respectively. Matt Crafton was going to be awarded with a 5th place finish, but was disqualified after post-race inspection, due to the front of the truck being too low to the ground. However, a few days later, ThorSport Racing won their appeal over NASCAR, and Crafton was able to keep his 5th place position.

Background 

Darlington Raceway is a race track built for NASCAR racing located near Darlington, South Carolina. It is nicknamed "The Lady in Black" and "The Track Too Tough to Tame" by many NASCAR fans and drivers and advertised as "A NASCAR Tradition." It is of a unique, somewhat egg-shaped design, an oval with the ends of very different configurations, a condition which supposedly arose from the proximity of one end of the track to a minnow pond the owner refused to relocate. This situation makes it very challenging for the crews to set up their cars' handling in a way that is effective at both ends.

First held in 2001, the spring Darlington race was taken off the schedule after 2004, then it returned from 2010 to 2011. The race returned to the Truck Series schedule once again in 2020. On December 11, Darlington Raceway announced its highly popular NASCAR Throwback weekend would move to the new May 7–9 weekend, effectively making a lineal swap of the two race meetings at the track.

Entry list 
 (R) denotes rookie driver.
 (i) denotes driver who are ineligible for series driver points.

Practice 
The only 30-minute practice session is scheduled to be held on Friday, May 6, at 3:00 PM EST.

Qualifying 
Qualifying was held on Friday, May 6, at 3:30 PM EST. Since Darlington is an oval track, the qualifying system used is a single-car, single-lap system with only one round. Whoever sets the fastest time in the round wins the pole.

No one would fail to qualify.

Race results 
Stage 1 Laps: 35

Stage 2 Laps: 55

Stage 3 Laps: 62

Standings after the race 

Drivers' Championship standings

Note: Only the first 10 positions are included for the driver standings.

References

Dead On Tools 200
Dead On Tools 200
NASCAR races at Darlington Raceway
Dead On Tools 200